Lilabati Bhattacharjee (née Ray) was a mineralogist, crystallographer and a physicist. She studied with the scientist Satyendra Nath Bose, and completed her MSc in physics from the University College of Science and Technology (commonly known as Rajabazar Science College), University of Calcutta in 1951.

Mrs Bhattacharjee worked in the fields of structural crystallography, optical transform methods, computer programming, phase transformations, crystal growth, topography, and  instrumentation. She served as a Senior Mineralogist at the Geological Survey of India, and later went on to become its Director (Mineral Physics). She was married to Siva Brata Bhattacherjee, and is survived by two children and two grandsons.

References 

Indian crystallographers
University of Calcutta alumni
Indian women physicists
Bengali physicists
Indian mineralogists
20th-century Indian physicists
Women scientists from West Bengal